"100% Chance of Rain" is a song written by Charlie Black and Austin Roberts, and recorded by American country music artist Gary Morris.  It was released in December 1985 as the third single from the album Anything Goes.  The song was Morris' third number one on the country chart as a solo artist.  The single went to number one for one week and spent a total of thirteen weeks on the country chart.

Background
This song displays a little more soft rock influence instead of country pop.

Chart performance

References

1986 singles
Gary Morris songs
Song recordings produced by Jim Ed Norman
Warner Records singles
Songs written by Austin Roberts (singer)
Songs written by Charlie Black
1985 songs